Gizem Karaca (born 7 September 1992) is a Turkish actress and model who represented her country at the Miss World 2011 competition.

Karaca competed at the Miss Turkey competition held on 2 June 2011 at TIM Show Centre and finished second overall, which qualified her as Turkey's representative for Miss World.

Early life and Career 
Gizem Karaca was born on September 7, 1992 in Istanbul. Her mother is Münevver Karaca and her father is Cüneyt Karaca. She is of Albanian origin on her mother's side. She spent her childhood in the USA and Canada as her family moved to the USA when she was a child. After Karaca completed elementary school in the United States and secondary school in Canada, she returned to Turkey. After graduating from high school, she won the Faculty of French Language and Literature at Istanbul University.

After graduating from the Faculty of French Language and Literature, Istanbul University, she decided to take part in the beauty pageant to escape from the difficult lessons. She took part in the Miss Turkey 2011 beauty pageant and came second. Gizem Karaca went to America for a while in the summer of 2013 and studied acting at the New York Film Academy. Gizem Karaca married Kemal Ekmekçi on September 16, 2017.

Her series is best known for "Güzel Köylü", "Benim Hala Umudum Var", "Alparslan: Büyük Selçuklu", "Eve Düşen Yıldırım", "Adını Feriha Koydum: Emirin Yolu".

She starred in the movie Hürkuş, based on the life of aviator Vecihi Hürkuş.

Filmography

Web series

Tv Series

Films

Awards 
Miss Turkey 2011, First Runner-up. 
Miss World 2011, The Best Dressed Award.

References

External links
Miss Turkey's profile at Miss World 2011
The Beautiful Hope: Gizem Karaca

Living people
Models from Istanbul
Turkish film actresses
Turkish television actresses
Turkish beauty pageant winners
Turkish female models
Turkish people of Albanian descent
1992 births
Actresses from Istanbul